Edgaras Žarskis (born 4 May 1994) is a Lithuanian footballer who plays for Džiugas.

Club career
He started career in Žalgiris Vilnius. Later was Atlantas, Palanga, Lietava Jonava, again Atlantas.

He played in Azerbaidjan (Sabail), Poland (Bytovia Bytów), Belarus (Gorodeya), Latvia (Tukums 2000 and Spartaks Jūrmala).

Puszcza Niepołomice 
In first jalf of  2021, he played for Puszcza Niepołomice.

JK Narva 
In July 2021 he signed with Estonian team JK Trans Narva. On 13 July he made his debut in Meistriliiga against Tammeka Tartu. He played all match, but his team lost the game by score 2:3.

References

External links

1994 births
Living people
Lithuanian footballers
Lithuania under-21 international footballers
Association football defenders
Lithuanian expatriate footballers
FK Žalgiris players
FK Atlantas players
FK Jonava players
Sabail FK players
FK Palanga players
Bytovia Bytów players
FC Gorodeya players
FK Spartaks Jūrmala players
Puszcza Niepołomice players
JK Narva Trans players
Lithuanian expatriate sportspeople in Azerbaijan
Lithuanian expatriate sportspeople in Poland
Lithuanian expatriate sportspeople in Belarus
Lithuanian expatriate sportspeople in Latvia
Lithuanian expatriate sportspeople in Estonia
Expatriate footballers in Azerbaijan
Expatriate footballers in Poland
Expatriate footballers in Belarus
Expatriate footballers in Latvia
Expatriate footballers in Estonia
FC Džiugas players